Win Tha Pyay Tun (born May Ki Ki Tun on 30 June 1985) is a  prominent Burmese traditional anyeint dancer and actress. She has performed over 300 dance concerts in Myanmar and 17 overseas countries. In 2015, she received a gold medal from Bauman University from Russia and was presented an honorary cultural award from the Russia Federation.

Early life and family
Win Tha Pyay Tun was born on 30 June 1985 in Mandalay, Myanmar. She comes from the traditional thabin family, all of her family member are traditional anyeint dancers and actors. Her grandparents are also anyeint dancers. Her father Khayan Win Tun, a retired anyeint dancer and her mother Myanmar Malay Thapyay, a retired anyeint dancer and vocal coach at the State School of Fine Arts, Mandalay. Her younger brother R Yone Oo, is also an anyeint dancer. She graduated from the State School of Fine Arts, Mandalay.

Career
After graduated, she worked as an officer at the Department of Culture, Mandalay for four years. Afterwards, she debuted as an anyeint dancer in her mother's anyeint concerts. She performed as a lead dancer in the Shumawa anyeint for two years. And then, she founded the anyeint troupe Shwe Maung Nama (The Golden Siblings) together with her younger brother. She has flourished as an anyeint dancer since 2005. Her first international concert was in Mexico. Throughout her career, she has performed over 300 dance concerts in the local and 17 countries.

Win Tha Pyay Tun made guest appearances in film Koe Se Sa Thar Laint Me in 2007. She then starred in television series Ywar Ma Gyi, aird on Myawaddy TV in 2009. Her hard work as a dancer and supporting roles in films was noticed by the film industry and soon, film casting offers came rolling in. In 2010, She made her leading role debut in the film Ta Bawa San, alongside June Ko. She has since starred in big-screen films Naung Twin Au Htan Twin Say Ta Dee, screened in 2018 and Thaung Tike Ka Kyar Say Thar, screened on 30 January 2020.<ref>{{cite news |title=သောင်းတိုက်က ကြားစေသား´´ရုပ်ရှင်ဇာတ်ကား ဇန်နဝါရီ ၃၀ ရက်မှ စတင်ကာ တစ်နိုင်ငံလုံးရှိ အဆင့်မြင့်ရုပ်ရှင်ရုံကြီးများတွင် ပြသသွားမည် |url=https://www.mdn.gov.mm/my/seaangttiukk-kaacesaaruprngjaattkaa-jnnwrii-30-rkm-cttngkaa-ttcniungngnlunri |work=Myanmar Digital News |date=27 January 2020 |language=my}}</ref>

In 2019, she starred in thriller film Mya Mya, playing a girl whose body entered by Mya Mya's spirit. The film was premiered in Myanmar cinemas on 6 February 2020 and became one of highest-grossing films in Myanmar.

Filmography
Film (Cinema)
 Koe Se Sa Thar Laint Me (ကိုးဆယ်ဆသာလိမ့်မယ်) (2007)
 Naung Twin Au Htan Twin Say Ta Dee (နောင်တွင် ဥဒါန်းတွင်စေသတည်း) (2018)
 Thaung Tike Ka Kyar Say Thar (သောင်းတိုက်ကကြားစေသား) (2020)
 Mya Mya (မြမြ) (2020)

Film

Over 10 films, including Ta Bawa San (တစ်ဘဝစံ) (2010)Tu Thaw Akyoe (တူသောအကျိုး) (2012)Atwin Sate (အတွင်းစိတ်) (2012)Latt Ma Yount (လက်မရွံ့) (2015)Yarzawin Aoe (ရာဇဝင်အိုး) (2016)BSA Moe Kaung and Bicycle Thar Gi'' (ဘီအက်စ်အေမိုးကောင်းနှင့် ဘိုင်စကယ်သာဂိ) (2017)

Television series

References

External links
 

1985 births
Living people
Burmese dancers
Burmese film actresses
21st-century Burmese actresses
People from Mandalay